Binodoxys communis is a parasitoid wasp of the genus Binodoxys. The genus Binodoxys is located in the subfamily Aphidiinae which are noted parasitoids of aphids.

Description  
The adults of Binodoxys communis are approximately 1.2 mm in length. This small braconid wasp has a brown head, antennae, legs, and thorax. The wing venation is brown and the wings are nearly hyaline. The first tergite, trochanters, and the base of the tibiae are yellow. The rest of the abdomen is brown. Ovipositer sheaths and prongs are relatively lighter in color.

Economic value 
Binodoxys communis was released in the United States prior to 1979 to control Aphis gossypii (Glover), but establishment resulting from that release was questionable. Binodoxys communis was vetted and released in the United States again in 2007 to control the soybean aphid, Aphis glycines Matsumura. 
Establishment of B. communis throughout the United States has been questionable, likely due to reduced aphid population because of fungal pathogens, competition with other species of parasitoid, and prophylactic usage of pesticides.

References

Braconidae
Insects described in 1926